Dylan James Fox (born 15 April 1994) is a Northern Irish-born Australian professional footballer who plays as a defender for Indian Super League club Jamshedpur.

Club career

Sutherland Sharks
Fox started his youth career with Sydney-based Sutherland Sharks. He was promoted to the senior team in 2013 and played in the National Premier Leagues NSW.

Bonnyrigg White Eagles
In 2014, he moved to Bonnyrigg White Eagles and played until 2015 and scored 3 goals in 43 league matches.

Wellington Phoenix
In October 2015, Fox joined the A-League with Wellington Phoenix offering him a two-year contract. He was named the Player's Player at the Wellington Phoenix awards for the 2017–18 season and was a close second to Roy Krishna for Player of the Year. He was also named the best Wellington Phoenix Under-23 Player of the Year in 2016. In March 2019, Wellington Phoenix and Fox mutually terminated his contract while he was sidelined with a season-ending injury and having received an offer from Korean club FC Anyang.

FC Anyang
On 18 March 2019, Fox signed for K League 2 club FC Anyang. Without any appearances, he left the club in August.

Central Coast Mariners
In August 2019, Fox returned to the A-League, signing a one-year contract with Central Coast Mariners.

NorthEast United
On 2 October 2020, Fox joined Indian Super League club NorthEast United on a one-year deal. Appearing in 21 matches, he played a crucial role in their campaign, helping Khalid Jamil's side finish third on the league table before bowing out to ATK Mohun Bagan in the semi-finals.

FC Goa
On 31 August 2021, Fox joined another Indian Super League club FC Goa on a one-year deal. He scored his first ISL goal on 23 January 2022 against Bengaluru in Goa's 1–1 draw.

Jamshedpur
On 30 December 2022, Fox signed for Jamshedpur on a contract until the end of the 2022–23 season.

References

External links

	

Living people
1994 births
Association football defenders
Association footballers from Northern Ireland
Australian soccer players
Northern Ireland emigrants to Australia
Wellington Phoenix FC players
FC Anyang players
Central Coast Mariners FC players
A-League Men players
New Zealand Football Championship players
National Premier Leagues players
Expatriate footballers in India
Australian expatriate sportspeople in India
Australian expatriate soccer players
NorthEast United FC players
Indian Super League players
Australian expatriate sportspeople in South Korea
Expatriate association footballers in New Zealand
Expatriate footballers in South Korea
Australian expatriate sportspeople in New Zealand